Therese Ann Markow is the Amylin Chair in Life Sciences at the University of California, San Diego. Her research involves the use of genetics and ecology to study the insects of the Sonoran Desert. She was awarded the Presidential Early Career Award for Scientists and Engineers in 2001 and the Genetics Society of America George Beadle Award in 2012. Her research received widespread attention for its alleged misuse of Native American genetic data.

Early life and education 
Markow studied physical anthropology at Arizona State University (ASU). She was a member of the honorary Phi Kappa Phi. She remained there for her doctoral studies, focussing on Drosophila genetics with Charles Woolf. She completed her doctorate in 1974, and spent time as a postdoctoral researcher at Indiana University in the laboratory of Anthony Mahowald. Upon returning to Arizona, she held research professor positions before being appointed an assistant professor at ASU.

Research and career 
Markow was appointed a professor of zoology at ASU in 1990. In 1993 she initiated the Minority Access to Research Careers program, supported by NIH, to support students from underrepresented groups pursue careers in biosciences. She served as Director of the National Science Foundation Program in Population Biology. In 1995 she was awarded a Fulbright Program fellowship, which allowed her to pass a semester at the Monterrey Institute of Technology, Campus Guaymas, in Sonora, where she conducted long-term studies on natural populations of cactophilic Drosophila. At Arizona State University she became Regents Professor, the highest honour bestowed upon a faculty member. During her last three years at Arizona State University, she served as editor-in-chief of the journal Evolution.

In 1999, Markow moved to the University of Arizona in Tucson as Regents’ Professor of Ecology and Evolutionary Biology and Director of the Center for Insect Science. Upon moving to the University of Arizona, she moved the National Drosophila Species Stock Center to Tucson, establishing annual workshops, with Patrick O’Grady of Cornell University, on the use of species other than D. melanogaster for research. Markow founded the Drosophila Species Genome Consortium, the genomes of 12 Drosophila species were sequenced, assembled, annotated, which expanded the genetic resources available to the research community.

Markow joined University of California, San Diego in 2008, where she was appointed Amylin Chair in Life Sciences and continued as Director of the Drosophila Species Stock Center which moved with her to UCSD. In 2012 she joined the National Laboratory for the Genomics of Biodiversity in Mexico, which allowed her research alongside participating in the training of Mexican graduate students. Since 2013 she has served as one of Mexico's Sistema Nacional de Investigadores (SNI III). Her research recently has focussed upon use of ecological diverse Drosophila species as a models to understand public health problems such as diabetes and obesity. In addition to her studies of ecological and evolutionary genomics of Drosophila, she undertook, with funding from the World Wildlife Fund, studies of the genetics and genomics of monarch butterflies in Mexico.

Havasupai Studies Controversy 
Markow has been accused of unethical and unauthorized use of DNA samples collected from Havasupai individuals, Native American inhabitants of the Grand Canyon. The samples had been collected in 1989 with consent to research the community's rate of diabetes. However, tribe members discovered the samples were used without the community's consent to research topics on mental illness as well as theories of the tribe's geographical origins. Markow used the samples to research mental disorders such as schizophrenia without informing the tribe.

In response to the misuse of their genetic data the Havasupai people, issued a "banishment order" to keep Arizona State University employees from setting foot on their reservation. The tribe filed a legal complaint, Havasupai Tribe vs. the Arizona Board of Regents, they brought six charges including lack of informed consent, violation of civil rights, and intentional or negligent infliction of emotional distress. In 2010, The University of Arizona Board of Regents settled the case in an attempt to “remedy the wrong that was done.” They agreed to pay the Havasupai 700,000 dollars, as well as return the collected blood samples. Markow and her fellow researchers who used the tribal DNA have been accused of "tak[ing] advantage of a vulnerable population," "failing to follow proper protocols and regulations," and "inflict[ing] permanent harm on the participating community." Markow has defended her work as "good science."

Awards and honours 
 Her awards and honours include:
 2001 Presidential Award for Excellence in Science, Mathematics, and Engineering Mentoring
 2005 YWCA USA Women on the Move Honoree
 2006 Elected President of the Society for the Study of Evolution
 2007 Arizona State University Women's Plaza of Honour
 2008 Elected Fellow of the American Association for the Advancement of Science
 2012 Genetics Society of America George Beadle Award

Selected publications 
Her publications include:

References 

1949 births
Living people
University of California, San Diego faculty
Arizona State University alumni
Arizona State University faculty
Fellows of the American Association for the Advancement of Science